Route 505 is an MTR  route linking Sam Shing stop and Siu Hong stop, in the southern and northern parts of Tuen Mun, Hong Kong, respectively. The route is coloured red on the Light Rail system map.

At the time, the trains towards Siu Hong had a different number, 504.

Stops
 
 
 
 
   (Tuen Mun station)
 
  (to Siu Hong only)
  (to Siu Hong only)
  (to Sam Shing only)
 
 
 
 
 
 
  (to Siu Hong only)
   (Siu Hong station)

505